The Song of Çelo Mezani is an Albanian polyphonic folk song. It is considered to be the best-known Cham Albanian song. The song increased the awareness in Albania about the Chameria region and its history.

History
The song was composed during the period of the Albanian National Awakening and is a narrative and a lament of the death of Çelo Mezani, a well-known Cham Albanian revolutionary from the village of Arpitsa (modern Perdika) in modern north-western Greece (Çamëria). Çelo Mezani lived in the late 19th century and was a kaçak who fought against Ottoman  and participated in the anti Tanizmat Albanian revolt of 1847. Not yet clear what happened to him but it is thought that the Ottoman agents managed to kill him through betrayal.

Song
The song of Çelo Mezani consists of three parts and is sung by two soloists and a drone group. It was recorded officially in 1957 in Fier in the Myzeqe region and in Skelë in the area of Vlorë by Cham Albanian refugees who had settled in those areas after the expulsion of Cham Albanians. In both recording the groups sang a cappella.

It was supposed to be performed in the National Folklore Festival of Gjirokastër in 1973, but the communist regime censored it. In 1978 it was performed for the first time at the National Folklore Festival of Gjirokastër by a folk singers' group from Rrogozhinë. In the festival of Gjirokastër the song was accompanied by an instrumental ensemble of violin, clarinet, lahutë and def. It was well received by the public and became a synonym of Cham Albanian music. The Song of Çelo Mezani is a polyphonic song well known throughout Albania and revered for having a deeply emotional quality and artistic mastery. According to Albanian composer Agim Krajka, the song was one of the best ways for the Albanian public to know better the Chameria region and its history.

Lyrics
The first soloist sings in a narrative way, while the second soloist replies to him by singing the second part of the verse again. The drone group provides vocal backing. The first verse of the song is:

Published in 1995, a rendition of the song was recorded in Tiranë (1945) by folklorist Fatos Mero Rrapaj from incoming Cham refugees originating from Parga, Greece. Rrapaj noted that during that time there were a few variants of the song and the one he recorded was with the most and complete lyrics.

See also
 Cham Albanians
 Music of Albania
 Polyphonic song of Epirus

External links
 Live performance of the song of Çelo Mezani
 Recorded version of the song

Sources

Albanian folk songs
Albanian folklore
Year of song unknown